The 1913–14 Hong Kong First Division League season was the 6th since its establishment.

Overview
Duke of Cornwall's Light Infantry won the championship.

References
RSSSF

1913-14
1913–14 domestic association football leagues
1913 in Hong Kong
1914 in Hong Kong